The 2014–15 USC Trojans men's basketball team represented the University of Southern California during the 2014–15 NCAA Division I men's basketball season. They were led by second-year head coach Andy Enfield. They played their home games at the Galen Center and were members of the Pac-12 Conference. They finished the season 12–20, 3–15 in Pac-12 play to finish in last place. They advanced to the quarterfinals of the Pac-12 tournament where they lost to UCLA.

Previous season 
The 2013–14 USC Trojans finished the season with an overall record of 11–21, and 2–16 in the Pac-12 regular season. In the 2014 Pac-12 tournament, the team was defeated by Colorado, 56–59 in the first round.

Off Season

Departures

2014 Recruiting Class

Roster

Schedule

|-
!colspan=12 style="background:#990000; color:#FFCC00;"| Exhibition

|-
!colspan=12 style="background:#990000; color:#FFCC00;"| Non-conference regular season

|-
!colspan=12 style="background:#990000;"| Pac-12 regular season

|-
!colspan=12 style="background:#990000;"| Pac-12 tournament

References

USC
USC Trojans men's basketball seasons
USC Trojans
USC Trojans